Leighton Gary Allen (born 22 November 1973) is an English former footballer who played as a forward in the Football League for Colchester United. He was also on the books at Premier League club Wimbledon, but failed to make a first-team appearance. He broke Kevin Campbell's (Arsenal) youth team goalscoring record for Wimbledon with 81 goals over two seasons.

Career

Born in Brighton, Allen was on the books at Premier League club Wimbledon for two years prior to his release in the summer of 1994. Unable to break into the first team, he joined Gillingham for a short stint until he was signed by Colchester United manager George Burley. Allen made just two Football League substitute appearances for the club, the first as a replacement for Paul Abrahams in a 1–0 win against Hartlepool United at Layer Road on 10 September 1994, and in the second he came on for Chris Fry in a 3–2 away victory at Darlington on 24 September. Shortly after this, Allen was released from Colchester as Burley built up his squad.

Following his brief Football League stint, Allen returned to his south-coast roots to play for Ringmer, Saltdean United, Lewes, Crawley Town, Worthing and Peacehaven & Telscombe.

References

External links

1973 births
Living people
Footballers from Brighton
English footballers
Association football forwards
Wimbledon F.C. players
Gillingham F.C. players
Colchester United F.C. players
Ringmer F.C. players
Saltdean United F.C. players
Lewes F.C. players
Crawley Town F.C. players
Worthing F.C. players
Peacehaven & Telscombe F.C. players
English Football League players